The Duchy of Montbazon is the area around Montbazon, near Tours, in France.  During the Ancien Régime, Montbazon became a seigneurie held by the House of Rohan in the fifteenth century; was elevated to a comté in 1557, and raised to the level of a duchy in 1588.

List of Lords of Guéméné, ca. 1430—1557

List of Counts of Montbazon, 1557—1611

List of Dukes of Montbazon, 1588—Present

References

 This page is based on this page on French Wikipedia.

Dukes of France
House of Rohan
Noble titles created in 1588
Noble titles created in 1595